Young Royals is a Swedish teen drama romance streaming television series on Netflix. Set at the fictional elite boarding school Hillerska, the plot primarily follows the fictional Prince Wilhelm of Sweden (Edvin Ryding), his romance with fellow male student Simon Eriksson (Omar Rudberg), and the drama which results.

The show was created by Lisa Ambjörn, Lars Beckung, and Camilla Holter, and premiered on 1 July 2021. On 22 September 2021, the series was renewed for a second season, which was released on 1 November 2022. In December 2022, the series was renewed for a third and final season.

The third season will be shooted between March-June 2023. There had been three calls for extra, and one of them indicated that they need a driver for 28th-28th March to shoot in The Stora Sundby Castle in Eskilstuna.

Cast and characters

Main
Edvin Ryding as Prince Wilhelm "Wille" of Sweden, next in line to Sweden's throne after his older brother, Erik
Omar Rudberg as Simon Eriksson, a rising star in Hillerska's choir, a scholarship and non-boarding student; Sara's brother and Wilhelm's love interest.
Malte Gårdinger as August Horn of Årnäs, a member of a noble family and second cousin of Wilhelm and Erik, third-year student, prefect and captain of the rowing team
Frida Argento as Sara Eriksson, a scholarship non-boarding student and Simon's sister, who has social difficulty as a result of her Asperger syndrome and ADHD
Nikita Uggla as Felice Ehrencrona, a boarding student and member of the "modern nobility"

Recurring
Pernilla August as Queen Kristina of Sweden, the Queen regnant of Sweden and Wilhelm and Erik's mother
Carmen Gloria Pérez as Linda, Simon and Sara's mother
Inti Zamora Sobrado as Ayub, Simon's friend from Bjärstad
Beri Gerwise as Rosh, Simon's friend from Bjärstad
Ivar Forsling as Prince Erik (season 1), the crown prince of Sweden and Wilhelm's older brother
Leonard Terfelt as Micke (season 1), Simon and Sara's father
Ingela Olsson as Miss Anette Lilja, Hillerska's headmistress
Felicia Truedsson as Stella, Felice's friend and a student at Hillerska
Mimmi Cyon as Fredrika, Felice's friend and a student at Hillerska
Nathalie Varli as Madison McCoy, Felice's friend and an international student at Hillerska
Samuel Astor as Nils, August's friend and a student at Hillerska. In the second season, he also came out of the closet.
Xiao-Long Rathje Zhao as Alexander, August's friend and a student at Hillerska
Fabian Penje as Henry, August's friend and a student at Hillerska
Nils Wetterholm as Vincent, August's friend and a student at Hillerska
Tommy Wättring as Marcus (season 2), Simon's love interest
Magnus Ehrner as Jan Olof Munck (season 2), a royal adviser

Episodes

Series overview

Season 1 (2021)

Season 2 (2022)

Production

Filming

The series was mostly filmed at Kaggeholms gård, a manor-style building located in Stockholm County that is operated as a conference center. The scenes that took place at the royal palace were filmed at Stora Sundby Castle. The six-episode series was created by Lisa Ambjörn, Lars Beckung and Camilla Holter, and premiered on Netflix on 1 July 2021. On 22 September 2021, the series was renewed for a second season, which was released on 1 November 2022.

In February 2022, Netflix began filming a second season. A promotional video was released on Instagram. Filming for the second season wrapped in May 2022.

Casting
In January 2021, long before the announcement of the series' release date, Edvin Ryding, Pernilla August, Malte Gårdinger, Frida Argento, Nikita Uggla and Omar Rudberg were announced to have been cast in the starring roles while Nathalie Varli, Felicia Truedsson, Mimmi Cyon, Ingela Olsson, Rennie Mirro, Livia Millhagen and David Lenneman were announced to have been cast in the recurring roles. Ryding was cast as Prince Wilhelm and August was cast to play his mother, Queen Kristina of Sweden. It was later announced that Rudberg would play Simon, Prince Wilhelm's love interest.

Marketing
The series' official teaser was released on 19 May 2021 with the official trailer released on 17 June 2021. On 15 December 2022, Ryding and Rudberg made their US television debut as guests on The Tonight Show Starring Jimmy Fallon, where they promoted Young Royals and its upcoming third and final season.

Reception

Viewership
The first season made it to the top 10 in 12 countries and was streamed for more than 9.8 million hours worldwide. In the first week after its release, the first season was ranked the 8th most streamed non-English language series on Netflix worldwide.

The second season made it to the top 10 in 26 countries and was streamed more than 18 million hours in the first week. During this week, the second season was ranked the 3rd most streamed non-English language series on Netflix worldwide.

In its second week, the second season was streamed more than 6.2 million hours. It was the 10th most-streamed non-English language series on Netflix.

Critical reaction
Young Royals received critical acclaim and positive responses from audiences. On the review aggregation website Rotten Tomatoes, the series holds an approval rating of 100%, based on five reviews, with an average rating of 8.3/10. It has been praised for its fidelity to real life in casting teenagers for teenage roles and showing skin textures with blemishes. Some critics and audiences compared the series favourably to similar shows such as Elite, Gossip Girl, The Crown and Skam.

David Opie of Digital Spy praised Young Royals for "cast[ing] actors who actually look the age they're supposed to be playing" and "portray[ing] teenage life with some much-needed authenticity". He described the series as "an updated version of the classic Cinderella story" and concluded that the series "excels most [...] when it comes to the central romance between Wilhelm and Simon". TV critic Flora Carr of Radio Times in a review of the first two episodes described the series as "predictable but heartfelt". She criticised the series' "checklist of teen-romance visuals" and "the plot's reliance on characters like August", but ultimately concluded that "the authentically teenage cast may also prove a breath of fresh air" for younger viewers.

For the second season, Dieter Osswald of Swiss lifestyle magazine Display wrote: "Like stand-up characters, the separated lovers defy their fate and fight for their love. The chemistry between Edvin Ryding as the insecure prince and Omar Rudberg as the sensitive singer works even better than in the first season. Fans of creep August aka Malte Gardinger can look forward to bigger appearances with a strongly expanded role - including a naked phone call with the royal family."

Notes

References

External links

2020s high school television series
2020s LGBT-related drama television series
2020s teen drama television series
2021 Swedish television series debuts
Autism in television
Coming-of-age television shows
Gay-related television shows
High school television series
Mass media portrayals of the upper class
Swedish LGBT-related television series
Swedish-language Netflix original programming
Television series about dysfunctional families
Television series about teenagers
Television shows filmed in Sweden
Television shows set in Sweden
Television series about royalty
Bisexuality-related television series
Male bisexuality in fiction